Amazoonops is a genus of spiders in the family Oonopidae. It was first described in 2017 by Ott, Ruiz, Brescovit & Bonaldo. , it contains 5 species, all from Brazil.

References

Oonopidae
Araneomorphae genera
Spiders of Brazil